is a Japanese former beach volleyball player. She competed in the women's tournament at the 2000 Summer Olympics.

References

External links
 

1974 births
Living people
Japanese women's beach volleyball players
Olympic beach volleyball players of Japan
Beach volleyball players at the 2000 Summer Olympics
Sportspeople from Ehime Prefecture